WCRA may refer to:

 WCRA, a radio station (1090 AM) licensed to Effingham, Illinois, United States
 West Coast Railway Association, railroad museum in Squamish, British Columbia, Canada
 Women's Cycle Racing Association